A list of films produced by the Marathi language film industry based in Maharashtra in the year 1991.

1991 Releases
A list of Marathi films released in 1991.

References

Lists of 1991 films by country or language
 Marathi
1991